is a former Nippon Professional Baseball catcher.

External links

1955 births
Living people
Baseball people from Hiroshima Prefecture
Toyo University alumni
Japanese baseball players
Nippon Professional Baseball catchers
Hiroshima Toyo Carp players
Managers of baseball teams in Japan
Hiroshima Toyo Carp managers